The Otamiri River is one of the main rivers in Imo State, Nigeria. The river takes its name from Ota Miri, a deity who owns all the waters that are called by his name, and who is often the dominating god of Mbari houses. The river runs south from Egbu past Owerri and through Nekede, Ihiagwa, Eziobodo, Olokwu Umuisi, Mgbirichi and Umuagwo to Ozuzu in Etche, in the  Rivers State, from where it flows to the Atlantic Ocean.

The watershed is mostly covered by depleted rain forest vegetation, with mean temperatures of  throughout the year. Conversion of the tropical rainforest to grassland with slash and burn practices is degrading soil quality.

The Nworie river is subject to intensive human and industrial activities, and is used as a source of  drinking water by the poor when the public water system fails. The Nworie is polluted by organic wastes but in 2008 was not above acceptable levels of chemical pollution. Waste management in Owerri is inefficient and contributes to pollution of the river. Most of the wastes from Owerri are dumped at the Avu landfill in Owerri West on the Port Harcourt highway, which creates a high concentration of phosphate and nitrate in the Otamiri.

South of Owerri the river flows through an alternating sequence of sands, sandstones and clay-shales. Random sand samples from the bank of Otamiri River between Chokocho and Umuanyaga, Etche Local Government Area, Rivers State showed that 86 percent of the sand particles are within the ideal range for glass making.

Pollution in Otamiri River 
Imo State Water and Sewerage Corporation has suggested that Otamiri River been the main source of potable water to Owerri, may dry up, if urgent care is not taken to stop the continued  pollution of water. Also, the World Bank would start a project to provide safe water for Imo citizens by January 2020.

ENVIRONMENTAL IMPACT 
The Nworie river is used as a source of  drinking water when the public water system fails, but it is subject to intensive human and industrial activities. The Nworie is polluted by organic wastes but levels of chemical pollution was not accepted in 2008. Waste management in Owerri is inefficient and contributes to pollution of the river. Most of the wastes from Owerri are dumped at the Avu landfill in Owerri West on the Port Harcourt highway, which creates a high concentration of phosphate and nitrate in the Otamiri.

Pictures of Otamiri River at Egbu

References
 

Rivers of Nigeria
Imo State